Saka were the Achaemenid "Scythian" satrapy.

Saka may also refer to:

Scythians
Scythians
Indo-Scythians
Saka era, an era in India
Indian national calendar, sometimes called the Saka calendar

Places
Saka, Hiroshima, a town in Hiroshima Prefecture, Japan
Saka, Estonia, a village in Kohtla Parish, Ida-Viru County, Estonia
Saka, Latvia, a village  in Saka Parish of Pāvilosta Municipality, Latvia. 
Saka, Morocco, a town in Taza Province, Morocco
Saka, Sirhind a town in State Punjab in India

Other uses
Saka or a last stand in battle, an ancient Indian tradition of men fighting to death. The practice was accompanied by jauhar, a  women self-immolation when facing certain defeat in a war.
Saka language, a variety of Eastern Iranian languages, attested from the ancient Buddhist kingdoms of Khotan and Tumshuq in the Tarim Basin
Makhuwa language, also Makhuwa-Saka language, a dialect of Nkutu in the Democratic Republic of the Congo

People with the surname
Bukayo Saka (born 2001), English footballer
Fuat Saka (born 1952), Turkish musician
Hasan Saka (1885–1960), Turkish politician
, Japanese baseball player
, Japanese footballer
, Japanese actor and voice actor
Paul Saka, American philosopher
Pınar Saka (born 1985), Turkish sprinter
, Japanese swimmer

See also
Shaka (disambiguation)
Sakha (disambiguation)
Acestor Sakas, an Athenian tragic poet

Japanese-language surnames
Turkish-language surnames